Kahit Konting Pagtingin is a 1990 romantic action film directed by Pablo Santiago and starring Fernando Poe Jr. and Sharon Cuneta. It also stars Ricky Davao, Bing Loyzaga, Paquito Diaz, Dencio Padilla, Subas Herrero, Lucita Soriano, Bert Olivar, and Romeo Rivera. The plot revolves around Georgia, a spoiled heiress, and her humble bodyguard Delfin.

Produced by Viva Films, the film was released on February 14, 1990, and was a box office hit, surpassing a box office record held by Starzan: Shouting Star of the Jungle. A sequel, Minsan Pa: Kahit Konting Pagtingin Part 2, was released in 1995. The film is also Poe's first with Viva Films outside of a brief cameo in the Joey de Leon-starrer "She-Man: Mistress of the Universe" (1988).

Cast

Fernando Poe Jr. as Delfin Maniego
Sharon Cuneta as Georgia Zaragosa
Ricky Davao as Charlie Torres, Georgia's suitor 
Bing Loyzaga as Cynthia, Georgia's secretary and friend 
Paquito Diaz as Donato
Dencio Padilla as Basilio
Subas Herrero as Don Dionisio Zaragosa
Lucita Soriano as Teresa
Ali Sotto as Cora
Bert Olivar as Damian Zaragosa
Romeo Rivera as Mr. Torres
Naty Santiago as Nana Juling
Manjo del Mundo as Cesar
Ernie Zarate as Atty. Alvarez
Ronald Jayme as Jeffrey
Vangie Labalan
Rene Tupaz
Usman Hasmin
Ronnie Olivar
George Sura
Buddy Dator
Telly Babasa
Bebeng Amora
Bert Garon
Efren Belardo
Renato Tanchingco
Van de Leon Jr.
Boy Sta. Maria
Boy Bernal
Boy Gomez
Gonzalo Salvador

Production

Filming
During filming, Fernando Poe Jr. regularly brought Sharon Cuneta food on set. Though Kahit Konting Pagtingin is a love story, no kissing scene was shot between Poe and Cuneta.

Release
Before release, Kahit Konting Pagtingin was already expected to become an enormous success at the box office with its pairing of two highly popular stars in Philippine show business. It was released on February 14, 1990, in 82 theaters within Metro Manila, a record number at the time.

Box office
The film was highly successful at box office. It earned ₱5 million on its first day, a Wednesday, and later earned more than ₱6 million the next Sunday. It eventually surpassed a box office record set by Starzan: Shouting Star of the Jungle in 1989.

Home media
Kahit Konting Pagtingin was released on DVD by Viva Video in 2002. Later, it was paired with its sequel Minsan Pa for Viva Video's "Da King" collector's edition DVD release.

Sequel
A sequel, Minsan Pa: Kahit Konting Pagtingin Part 2, was released in 1995 and was directed by Eddie Rodriguez.

Awards and nominations

References

External links

1990 films
1990 action films
1990s romantic action films
Filipino-language films
Films about bodyguards
Philippine action films
Films directed by Pablo Santiago